The Mansouri attack occurred on 13 April 1996, when an Israel Defence Forces helicopter attacked a vehicle in Mansouri, a village in Southern Lebanon, killing two women and four children.

Attack 
At 1:30 PM, Abbas Jiha, a farmer and volunteer ambulance driver, was driving a Volvo vehicle, with the word "ambulance" written in red. He was taking wounded people as well as four of his children to Sidon. A US-made Israeli Apache helicopter chased the car and fired two missiles at it. It killed 6 civilians out of the 13 passengers who were escaping the village. The children ages ranged from 7 months to 9 years.

Victims 

 Mona Shuweikh, 27 years
 Nukha Al Oglah, 35 years
Huda Al Oglah, 11 years
 Zeinab Jeha, 7 years
 Hanin Jeha, 3 years
 Mariam Jeha, 1 month

Aftermath 
Although Israeli officials admitted that the vehicle was targeted, Major General Moshe Ya'alon claimed that it was "used by fighters to flee", but an investigation by Amnesty International found no connection between anyone of them to Hezbollah.  Robert Fisk said that Israel broke the Geneva Conventions, which protect civilians even if they were around "armed antagonists". B'Tselem called it a "blatant violation of the laws of war".

See also 
 Qana massacre
 Nabatieh Fawka attack
 Operation Grapes of Wrath

References

External links 
 Footage

1996 in Lebanon
April 1996 events in Asia
Operation Grapes of Wrath
Massacres in Lebanon
South Lebanon conflict (1985–2000)
Tyre District
Massacres committed by Israel